T113 or variation, may refer to:

Vehicles
 FMC T113, an aluminum-based prototype of the M113 armoured personnel carrier
 Talus MB-H amphibious tractor T 113
 , a World War II Lend-Lease ship; formerly the Admirable-class minesweeper USS Alarm (AM-140)
 HMT Wisteria (T113), a World War II British Royal Navy Tree-class trawler built by Smith's Dock Company
 , a World War I Imperial German Navy S90-class torpedo boat, later renamed T 113
 French boat Branlebas (T113), a World War II French Navy La Melpomène-class torpedo boat; see List of ships at Dunkirk
 Japanese ship T-113, a World War II Imperial Japanese Navy No.101-class landing ship; see List of shipwrecks in November 1944
 Thai ship Tor.113 (T.113), a Royal Thai Navy ship, a M36-class fast attack craft; see List of equipment of the Royal Thai Navy

Other uses
 Tetragrammaton Records "T-113" Tom Ghent; a 1969 album by Tom Ghent
 T113, a bus route in Kuala Lumpur, Malaysia; see List of bus routes in Greater Kuala Lumpur

See also

 Type 113 naval trawler of the People's Republic of China
 Vickers Type 113 Vespa, British Interwar biplane
 
 
 T13 (disambiguation)
 113 (disambiguation)